Cycling at the 2016 Summer Paralympics consisted of 50 events in two main disciplines, track cycling and road cycling. The venues were the Rio Olympic Velodrome for track cycling in the Barra Cluster,  and the Flamengo Park for the road cycling disciplines in the Copacapana Cluster. Seventeen events were contested on the track, and 33 on the road.

Classification
Cyclists are given a classification depending on the type and extent of their disability. This method is known as a functional system and was introduced in 2012. Athletes are classified according to their functional ability across four broad categories (blind or partially sighted tandem, handcycle, tricycle and standard bicycle). The class number indicates the severity of impairment with "1" being most impaired. The classification system allows cyclists to compete against others with a similar level of function.

Riders with recovering or deteriorating conditions such as MS are eligible but must have been reclassified within six months of a World Championships or Paralympic Games to ensure their classification is correct. Specialised equipment including prostheses is only allowed where it has been specifically approved.

 B – tandem bicycle
This class is for athletes who have visual impairments and therefore ride tandem bicycles with a guide (known as a pilot). They may have any level of visual impairment from no light perception in either eye through to a visual acuity of 6/60 and/or a visual field of less than 20 degrees.

 H (1-5) – handcycle
This class is for athletes who are lower limb amputees, have paraplegia or tetraplegia and ride a handcycle using arms to turn pedals for propulsion. H1–4 cyclists compete in a lying position, whereas H5 cyclists compete in a kneeling position.

 T (1-2) – tricycle
This class is for athletes who have a neurological condition or an impairment which has a comparable effect on their cycling so that they are not able to compete on a standard bicycle for reasons of balance.

 C (1-5) – standard bicycle
This class is for athletes with moderate locomotion impairment who do not require a tricycle. In many cases a modification will be allowed to accommodate a leg or arm prosthesis.

Factored events

Some cycling events, 16 in total across track and road, are factored. This can happen when cyclists from different classes compete against each other and means that the results take into account the severity of the impairments of each competitor. As a result, some riders within an event will have their times ‘factored’ while other riders will not, or will have their time factored in a different calculation. The gold medal goes to the athlete with the fastest time after all the required times have been calculated. It is therefore possible for an athlete to break a paralympic or world record in their event for their specific classification, but to finish behind a differently classified athlete in that event after factoring. In such a case, the record is still treated as an official World, or as the case may be, Paralympic Games record within their classification for that event.

Factoring should not be confused with certain events where athletes with a greater impairment are entitled to compete in a race for athletes with a 'lesser' impairment, for example double amputees (such as Oscar Pistorius) in a single leg amputee athletics race alongside runners such as Jonnie Peacock or Richard Browne. In such races, no factoring is taken into account. In cycling, a number of the road races are cross-classification and non-factored despite factoring taking place in the time trial for the same classifications.

Events
Events in each classification, including factored events in joined classifications are set out below.

 B: Blind or partially sighted, tandem bicycle
 H: Handcycle
 T: Tricycle
 C: Standard bicycle, with modifications

Participating nations
235 cyclists from 45 nations competed.

Medal summary

As at the Olympic Games, Great Britain had a clear lead in the medal table based on dominance within the velodrome, particularly in the female events where Kadeena Cox became the first British paralympian in 32 years to win golds in two different sports at the same Games, and Sarah Storey confirmed herself as the most successful female paralympian from Great Britain, overtaking the record set by fellow peer Tanni Grey-Thompson.

On the road, Germany, the Netherlands and Italy were dominant, with racing driver turned handcyclist Alex Zanardi winning two gold medals and a silver to add to an identical haul from London in 2012. The United States, Australia and China also won more than ten medals each across the 50 events.

Medal table 
after 50 of 50 events

Key
 Host nation (Brazil)

Road cycling

Men's events

Women's events

Mixed events

Track cycling

Men's events

Women's events

Mixed events

See also
 Cycling at the 2016 Summer Olympics

References

External links
 IPC
 UCI:Union Cycliste Internationale
 Results Book – Road
 Results Book – Track

 
2016
2016 Summer Paralympics events
Paralympics
Paralympics
2016 in cycle racing
International cycle races hosted by Brazil